Narcís Oller i de Moragas (10 August 1846, in Valls – 26 July 1930, in Barcelona) was a Catalan writer, most noted for the novels La papallona (The Butterfly) which appeared with a foreword by Émile Zola in the French translation; his most well-known work L'Escanyapobres (The Usurer); and  La febre d'or (Gold Fever) which is set in Barcelona during the period of promoterism. His novel La bogeria has been translated into English by Douglas Suttle under the title The Madness, published by Fum d'Estampa Press, 15 September 2020.
He also translated the works of Tolstoy and Dumas.

External links 

 Narcís Oller at the Association of Catalan Language Writers. 
 
 

1846 births
1930 deaths
People from Valls
Renaixença writers
Novelists from Catalonia
Catalan-language writers